Uri Segal (born 7 March 1944, Jerusalem) is an Israeli musical conductor.

Segal studied violin and conducting at the Rubin Academy of Music (now the Jerusalem Academy of Music and Dance).  From 1966 to 1969, he attended the Guildhall School of Music.

In 1969, shortly after his graduation, Segal won first prize in the Dimitri Mitropolous Conducting Competition in New York City. For a year after this, he served as Leonard Bernstein's assistant with the New York Philharmonic Orchestra.

From 1980 to 1982, Segal was the chief conductor of the Bournemouth Symphony Orchestra.  From 1981 to 1985, he was principal conductor of the Philharmonia Hungarica.  He has also served as artistic director of the Israel Chamber Orchestra.

In the US, Segal became Music Director of the Chautauqua Symphony Orchestra in 1990, and held the post through 2007.  In 1990, in Osaka, Japan, he founded the Century Orchestra and was its chief conductor through 1998.  He subsequently became the Century Orchestra's Laureate Conductor.

Segal married Ilana Finkelstein in 1966.  They have three daughters and a son.

References
 Holmes, John L. Conductors on Record, Victor Gollancz, 1982.
 Lyman, Darryl. Great Jews in Music, J. D. Publishers, 1986. 
 Sadie, Stanley. The New Grove Dictionary of Music and Musicians. Macmillan, 1980.

External links
 Segal's General Management  Schmidt Artists International
 Bach Cantatas page on Uri Segal
 Page on Century Orchestra

1944 births
Living people
Israeli conductors (music)
People from Jerusalem
21st-century conductors (music)